The Corporate Affairs and Intellectual Property Office (CAIPO) is a Barbadian governmental agency in charge of various aspects of industrial property right affairs including: patents, trademarks, and industrial designs. It is a division of the Ministry of Industry & International Business. The CAIPO office is located on Belmont Road, Saint Michael, Barbados.  The country ranks as one of the top countries where the greatest number of foreign patents are legally based.

National legislation
Corporate affairs in Barbados are covered by the following Acts:
Companies Act
Registration of Business Names Act
Bills of Sale Act
Small Business Development Act
Notarial acts
Public Documents Act
Pharmacy Act
Limited Partnerships Act
Registration of Newspapers Act
Trade Unions Act

Intellectual property in Barbados are covered by the following Acts:
Trademarks Act
Patents Act
Industrial Designs Act

At the international level, the department works very closely with the World Intellectual Property Organization (WIPO) and its subregional unit known as the Cooperation for Development Bureau for Latin American and Caribbean.

Treaties and conventions
Barbados is a signatory to the following copyright and intellectual property treaties and conventions influencing local laws:

Currently Barbados has yet to finalise or is absent from:

Domain names and trademarks
Additionally, CAIPO is entrusted with the handling of legal issues pertaining to Barbados' .bb ccTLD and second-level domains including: .co.bb, .com.bb, .net.bb, .org.bb, .info.bb, .store.bb, .tv.bb, .biz.bb .

See also 
 Patent office
 List of parties to international copyright treaties
 List of parties to international patent treaties
 List of parties to international related rights treaties
 List of company registers

References

External links 
 
 Public search for current CAIPO trademarks registered

Government agencies of Barbados
Intellectual property organizations
Patent offices
Treaties of Barbados